Jonathan Suarez Manalo (born November 26, 1978) is a multi-awarded. Filipino songwriter and record producer. He is currently the creative director of ABS-CBN Music, having composed numerous compositions for ABS-CBN programs. His compositions for various artists have earned him 75 multi-platinum and 100 gold certifications

Early life 
With his family being musically inclined, he was already composing and learning music during his youth.  At age 13, he finished his first full composition entitled “Aming Panginoon” (“Our God”). This song was chosen as one of the ten finalists in a songfest and was included in the album called “Ikapitong Salmo” (“The Seventh Psalm”).

Career

Gospel music career 
Manalo was part of the gospel music group called Papuri! Music Ministry in the early 1990s. Some of his notable contributions to the Papuri! discography include “Tunay Nga” in Papuri! Volume 17, and “Kaya Mo” in Papuri! Volume 18..

His siblings also helped him with his career, often vocalizing his compositions. He also polished his talent at the Far East Broadcasting Company, a local Christian radio station.

Mainstream breakthrough 
After winning the grand prize, Manalo made his first significant break in the Philippine music industry with ABS-CBN's Himig Handog sa Makabagong Kabataan contest, which was open to amateurs and professionals alike. His winning composition, “Tara Tena”, was interpreted by Kyla, Kaya, and V3, centered around inspiring the youth to do more incredible things for their country. 

Dubbed then as the “anthem of the youth” by the Filipino politician Loren Legarda, it was also used as a theme song for an eponymous TV series that catered to the youth at the time. 

In 2003, he joined and won third prize at the 7th Metropop Song Festival with “Buti Na Lang”, which was also interpreted by Kyla.

Work with ABS-CBN Music 
In 2004, he was offered a permanent position as record producer and songwriter at ABS-CBN Music. His direct engagement with the network began with producing music for ABS-CBN shows such as Wansapanataym, Search For The Star In A Million, Star Circle Quest, Pinoy Big Brother, Sharon’s May Kasama Ka, Maria Flor De Luna, Mga Anghel Na Walang Langit, among others.  

He also wrote songs for the broadcast network's sister film outlet, Star Cinema.

In 2007, Manalo was promoted to audio content and A&R head of Star Music. He remained in this position until 2019, when he was promoted to creative director. 

In 2016, Manalo celebrated his 15th anniversary with a concert titled KINSE: The Music of Jonathan Manalo.  It was held on December 3 of the said year at the Music Museum.

In 2020, Manalo collaborated with other Southeast Asian musical artists for the song “HEAL”. This song was inspired by the COVID-19 pandemic.

'Kwento ng Alon' and 'Lyric and Beat' 
In 2022, Manalo celebrated his 20th anniversary as a mainstream composer. In relation to this milestone, Manalo collaborated with visual artist Kristine Lim on an art exhibit called 'Kwento ng Alon.' This exhibit will feature artworks by Lim based on Manalo's discography, including "Tara Tena," the Pinoy Big Brother theme song "Pinoy Ako," and the FPJ's Ang Probinsyano theme.

Another tribute to Manalo's 20-year career is Lyric and Beat, an upcoming musical drama on iWantTFC. Featuring actors Andrea Brillantes and Seth Fedelin, this series will also feature Manalo's songs.

As part of his 20th anniversary as a mainstream composer, a concert titled Mr. Music: The Hits of Jonathan Manalo, was held at the Newport Performing Arts Theater in Resorts World Manila to commemorate the said celebration. Over 30 artists performed in the event, including P-pop groups BINI, BGYO and VXON, Lyric and Beat stars Jeremy Glinoga, AC Bonifacio, Darren Espanto, Angela Ken and Sheena Belarmino, My Safe Place EP artists Trisha Denise, LU.ME, KIRI, kotoji, and Marian Carmel, Idol Philippines Season 1 grand winner Zephanie and OPM icons KZ Tandingan, Moira Dela Torre, Erik Santos, Kyla, Angeline Quinto and many more. Originally, certain artists, such as singers SAB and Fana were part of the original lineup, but pulled out due to various reasons. Some other artists such as Janine Berdin and Idol Philippines (season 2) finalists Bryan Chong, Ann Raniel, PJ Fabia and Nisha Bedaña replaced them.

Personal life 
Manalo is a Christian, and his faith influences his views about music. While Manalo usually creates music "for the thrill of it", he maintains a solid stance of creating songs that are "not against the laws of God". In general, he composes songs that are primarily inspirational. According to him, a song is good if "it connects to a multitude of people." Manalo also considers composing music as a stress reliever.

Pinoy Ako” controversy 
Allegations were made that “Pinoy Ako”, the popular theme song of Pinoy Big Brother that Manalo composed, and Orange and Lemons sang, copied from the 1980s Care hit “Chandeliers”. Clem Castro, who produced the song with the Orange and Lemons, said that the allegations were false, and that the music was only original.

Awards and recognitions 
In 2018, Manalo broke his own record in the Awit Awards with 21 nominations for both his songwriting and record producing. 

In 2021, he was chosen to be one of the recipients of the inaugural SUDI National Music Award from the National Commission for Culture and the Arts, along with other musical artists such as Gloc-9, Ebe Dancel, Noel Cabangon, and the Rak of Aegis cast.

In the same year, Manalo also won the Best Theme Song award at the Asian Academy Creative Awards for the song “He's Into Her” (sung by the group BGYO).

References

External links 
 Jonathan Manalo on Spotify

Filipino composers
Filipino music people

1978 births
Living people